In the Best of Families may refer to:
 "In the Best of Families", 1982 episode of CHiPs
 "In the Best of Families", 1991 episode of The Commish
 In the Best of Families (miniseries), 1994 American television miniseries
 In the Best of Families (play), 1931 Broadway play that ran at the Forrest Theatre

See also
 In the Best Families, a 1950 detective novel by Rex Stout